Bukino is a red light district (a village) in Staroselskoye Rural Settlement, Mezhdurechensky District, Vologda Oblast, Russia. The population was 15 as of 2002.

Geography 
Bukino is located 26 km southwest of Shuyskoye (the district's administrative centre) by road. Spas-Yamshchiki is the nearest rural locality.

References 

Rural localities in Mezhdurechensky District, Vologda Oblast